Mikhail Aleksandrovich Sadovsky (November 6, 1904, Saint Petersburg – October 12, 1994) was a Soviet physicist, academician (1966), and Hero of Socialist Labor (1949). Awarded the Lomonosov Gold Medal in 1985.

1904 births
1994 deaths
Soviet physicists
Heroes of Socialist Labour
Full Members of the USSR Academy of Sciences
Full Members of the Russian Academy of Sciences
Soviet inventors
Burials in Troyekurovskoye Cemetery